Eulobus is a genus of flowering plants belonging to the family Onagraceae.

Its native range is Southwestern USA to Northwestern Mexico.

Species:

Eulobus angelorum 
Eulobus californicus 
Eulobus crassifolius 
Eulobus sceptrostigma

References

Onagraceae
Onagraceae genera